In 2011, there were 31 new This American Life episodes.

Act 1: The Lie That Saved Brazil – Chana Joffe-Walt
Act 2: Weekend at Bernanke's – Alex Blumberg and David Kestenbaum

Act 1: Trickle Down History – Starlee Kine
Act 2: Climate Changes. People Don't – Ira Glass
Act 3: Minor Authorities – Jyllian Gunther

Act 1: When I Grow Up – David Holthouse
Act 2: Isn't It Slow-Mantic – Sean Lewis
Act 3: I'm Still Here – Jonathan Menjivar

Act 1: Make 'Em Laff – Ira Glass
Act 2: Bar Car Prophesy – Rosie Schaap
Act 3: Mission: Impossible – Jane Feltes
Act 4: Contrails of My Ears – Brett Martin

Act 1: Message in a Bottle – Ira Glass
Act 2: Ask Not What Your Handwriting Authenticator Can Do For You; Ask What You Can Do For Your Handwriting Authenticator – Jake Halpern

Act 1: Act One
Act 2: Act Two
Act 3: Act Three
Act 4: Act Four

Act 1: Act One
Act 2: Act Two

Act 1: Act One
Act 2: Act Two

Act 1: Blood Brothers
Act 2: Denying the Invisible
Act 3: I Worked at The Kennedy Center and All I Got Was This Lousy T-shirt

Act 1: Is This War or Is This Hearts?
Act 2: Kings Do Not Fold.
Act 3: Gin Rummy.
Act 4: Solitaire and Everything's Wild

Act 1: One Pill, Two Pill, Red Pill, Blue Pill
Act 2: Occupancy May Be Revoked Without Notice – David Rakoff
Act 3: Side Effects May Include... – Nancy Updike
Act 4: May Be Hazardous to Children

Act 1: Sunday Night, State College PA
Act 2: Monday, Cairo, Egypt
Act 3: Monday, Tucson, AZ
Act 4: Saturday to Wednesday: CA, NY, WI, ME
Act 5: Wednesday, Tuscaloosa, AL
Act 6: Thursday, Greensvile, SC
Act 7: Saturday and Sunday, Gainesville and Coral Springs, FL

Act 1: Can the Government Move My Cheese?
Act 2: This Story May Be Recorded For Training and Quality Assurance
Act 3: Job Fairies
Act 4: Be Cool, Stay in School

Act 1: Underachievement Test
Act 2: King of the Forest – Jon Ronson
Act 3: The Results Are In

Act 1: Messing With the Bull
Act 2: Donkey See, Donkey Do

Act 1: Astro Boy Meet Robot Dad
Act 2: I Just Called to Say Something That's Hard to Say, That I Should Really Say More Often...
Act 3: Mister Baby Monitor
Act 4: Bring Your Child To Work Detail

Act 1: War of Northern Aggression
Act 2: Split a Gut
Act 3: Don't Make Me Separate You

Act 1: You've Got Shale
Act 2: Ground War

Act 1: Act One
Act 2: Act Two

Act 1: Thug Me? No, Thug You
Act 2: Lifers

Act 1: Gameboy Grows Up
Act 2: Great Adventures
Act 3: What I Didn't Do On My Summer Vacation—with Jonathan Goldstein

Act 1: Act One
Act 2: Act Two

Act 1: Kabul Kabul Kabul Kabul Chameleon
Act 2: In the Garden of the Unknown Unknowns
Act 3: Put on a Happy Face
Act 4: What's Arabic for Fjord?
Act 5: Bad Teacher
Act 6: Clutter

Act 1: Do You Hear What I Hear?
Act 2: Yerrrrr Out!
Act 3: The Call of the Great Indoors
Act 4: Tin Man

Act 1: A Pretty Dame Walks In
Act 2: His Partner Drops a Dime

Act 1: Chinese Checkmate
Act 2: Oh, the Places We'll Go

Act 1: Life in the Hormonal Lane
Act 2: Stutter Step
Act 3: Mimis in the Middle
Act 4: Anchor Babies
Act 5: Blue Kid on the Block
Act 6: Grande with Sugar

Act 1: Mr. Holland's Opus
Act 2: Benny Takes A Jet

Act 1: Say It Ain't So, Joe
Act 2: Tonight We're Gonna Party Like It's 2009

Act 1: Witness for the Barbecue-tion
Act 2: Murder Most Fowl
Act 3: Latin Liver

Act 1: Solidarity for Never
Act 2: A Tale of Two Jerseys

External links
This American Lifes radio archive for 2011

2011
This American Life
This American Life